Ilja Bereznickas (born January 1, 1948 in Vilnius, Lithuania) is a Lithuanian animator, illustrator, scriptwriter and caricaturist.

Biography
In 1970 he graduated in architecture from Kaunas Polytechnic Institute. In 1985 he graduated from the Postgraduate School of Scriptwriters and Film directors, Moscow, Russia (class of Fyodor Khitruk and Yuri Norstein ). Since 1985, with interruptions, he has worked at the National Lithuanian Film Studio - as director, artist and animator. Since 1990 he has worked in Israel, Norway and the U.S. producing and creating animated TV ads, shorts and feature animation films, and illustrating children's books. In 2002 he initiated and became the head of the Animation Programme Vilnius Academy of Art as part of the Photography and Media Art Faculty. In 2003 - 2004 he taught at the School of Visual Arts in New York.

Through his life he created many illustrated books and caricatures. From 1973 onwards he has participated in exhibitions of cartoons worldwide. Individual exhibitions were held in Vilnius (1980, 1997, 2005), and abroad.

Filmography
 Telephone - 1984 (Russia)
 The Last Present – 1985 (Russia)
 Hobgoblin (Lithuanian name "Baubas") – 1987 (Lithuania). Tomar, Portugal, films for children and youth "Mio" Award 1988.
 Bermuda ring - 1988 (Lithuania). Awards: Kiev "KROK" Film Festival in 1989; Bilbao sports film festival prize in 1990.
 Caution, Children - 1990 (Lithuania)
 Newspaper Man - 1991 (Lithuania)
 Our Plasticine Life - 1994 (Lithuania)
 Elephantasia – 1995 (Israel)
 Gurin with the Foxtail - 1998 (feature, Norway) - animation supervisor.
 Grandfather and Grandmother - 1999 (Lithuania)
 Hobgoblin Arithmetic - 2004 (Lithuania)
 No Need to Frighten Us - 2005 (Lithuania)
 Hobgoblin's Illness - 2006 (Lithuania)

See also
List of Lithuanian painters

References

Lithuanian animators
Lithuanian caricaturists
Lithuanian cartoonists
Lithuanian illustrators
Lithuanian film directors
Lithuanian animated film directors
1948 births
Living people
Film people from Vilnius
Kaunas University of Technology alumni
Academic staff of the Vilnius Academy of Arts
Lithuanian screenwriters
Male screenwriters
Lithuanian male writers